Gyraulus bekaensis is a species of freshwater snail, an aquatic pulmonate gastropod mollusk in the family Planorbidae, the ram's horn snails. It is endemic to Lebabon.

The specific name bekaensis is named after the Beqaa Governorate, where it occurs.

Distribution
The type locality is Aammiq, Beqaa Governorate, Lebanon. It is not known from anywhere else.

Habitat
Gyraulus bekaensis is a palustrine species that occurs in the Aammiq Wetland.

References

bek
Gastropods of Asia
Endemic fauna of Lebanon
Gastropods described in 2007